Willie Evans may refer to:

Willie Evans (footballer, born 1912) (1912–1976), Welsh footballer
Willie Evans (running back) (1937–2017), University of Buffalo
Willie Evans (footballer, born 1939), Ghanaian footballer
Willie Evans (defensive end) (born 1984), National Football League

See also
William Evans (disambiguation)